New Wehdem is an unincorporated community in Austin County, in the U.S. state of Texas. According to the Handbook of Texas, the community had a population of 100 in 2000. It is located within the Greater Houston metropolitan area.

History
The area in what is now known as New Wehdem today was first settled in the second half of the 19th century. Several residents from nearby Wehdem moved to this community in the early 1930s and was thus named New Wehdem after World War II. Its population was 150 in 1965. It declined soon after and was at 100 in the early 1990s through 2000. It is not to be confused with the one established in the 1890s, which was the original name of Wehdem.

Geography

Education
New Wehdem is served by the Bellville Independent School District.

References

Unincorporated communities in Austin County, Texas
Unincorporated communities in Texas